The Romness Bridge near Cooperstown, North Dakota is a Pratt through truss structure that was built in 1912 over the Sheyenne River.  It was listed on the National Register of Historic Places in 1997.

References

Road bridges on the National Register of Historic Places in North Dakota
Bridges completed in 1912
1912 establishments in North Dakota
National Register of Historic Places in Griggs County, North Dakota
Pratt truss bridges in the United States
Metal bridges in the United States
Transportation in Griggs County, North Dakota